Jorgelina Guanini (born 31 May 1992) is an Argentine professional boxer who has held the IBF junior bantamweight title since 2018.

Professional career
Guanini made her professional debut on 19 September 2015, fighting to a split draw (SD) against Lilian Dolores Silva at Club Rivadavia in Necochea, Argentina. One judge scored the bout 39–37 in favour of Guanini, the second scored it 39.5–37.5 to Silva while the third scored it a draw at 39–39.

After compiling a record of 7–0–1, Guanini faced Davinia Perez (5–0) for the vacant WBC Silver female super bantamweight title. The bout took place on 7 October 2017 at Gallera del López Socas in Las Palmas, Spain. Guanini suffered the first defeat of her career via split decision (SD). Two judges scored the bout 98–92 and 96–95 in favour of Perez while the third scored it 98–92 for Guanini. She bounced back from defeat with a ten-round majority decision (MD) victory over Julieta Cardozo (11–2) to capture the South American bantamweight title on 2 March 2018 at Club Deportivo Luján in San Salvador de Jujuy, Argentina. Two judges scored the bout in favour of Guanini with 96–95 and 98–97.5, while the third scored it a draw with 96–96.

Six months later, on 14 September, she faced undefeated IBF female junior bantamweight champion Débora Dionicius (28–0) at Club Ferro Carril in Concordia, Argentina. Guanini captured the title by SD to become a world champion in her eleventh professional fight, with two judges scoring the bout 96–94 in her favour while the third scored it 96–94 to Dionicius.

Professional boxing record

References

Living people
1993 births
Argentine women boxers
Sportspeople from Buenos Aires Province
Super-flyweight boxers
Bantamweight boxers
Super-bantamweight boxers
International Boxing Federation champions